This is a list of Brazilian television related events from 1973.

Events

Debuts

Television shows

1970s
Vila Sésamo (1972-1977, 2007–present)

Births
6 August - Vanessa Gerbelli, actress
26 September - Leandro Hassum, actor, comedian, writer & producer
20 October - Rodrigo Faro, TV host, actor & singer
22 November - Eliana Michaelichen Bezerra, TV host, actress & singer
30 November - Angélica Ksyvickis, TV host, actress, singer & businesswoman

Deaths

See also
1973 in Brazil